The following is a chronicle of events during the year 2003 in ice hockey.

National Hockey League
Art Ross Trophy as the NHL's leading scorer during the regular season:  
Hart Memorial Trophy: for the NHL's Most Valuable Player:  
Stanley Cup - New Jersey Devils defeat the Mighty Ducks of Anaheim

Canadian Hockey League
Ontario Hockey League:  the J. Ross Robertson Cup.
Quebec Major Junior Hockey League:  President's Cup (QMJHL)  
Western Hockey League:   President's Cup (WHL)  
Memorial Cup: Kitchener Rangers

World Hockey Championship
 Men's champion: Canada defeated Sweden by a 3-2 mark at the 2003 Men's Ice Hockey World Championships
 Junior Men's champion: At the 2003 World Junior Ice Hockey Championships, the Russia men's national junior ice hockey team won the gold medal.

European hockey

Women's hockey
 The top division of the 2003 IIHF Women's World Ice Hockey Championship was set to be held in Beijing, China, from April 4–9, 2003. However, it was cancelled due to the SARS crisis. 
 November 15, 2003: Kim St. Pierre was the first woman in CIS history to be credited with a win in a men's regular season game. This occurred when the McGill Redmen defeated the Ryerson Rams by a score of 5–2.

Minor League hockey

Junior A hockey

Season articles

Deaths

See also
2003 in sports

References